Bolivar Public Library, also known as the Carnegie Library of Bolivar and Polk County Genealogical Society Library, is a historic Carnegie library located at Bolivar, Polk County, Missouri.  It was built in 1915, and is a 1 1/2- to two-story, rectangular, brick building with Classical Revival style design elements.  It has a flat roof and three bay front facade with an elaborate center entranceway and large side window bays. It features intact terra cotta and tooled limestone ornamentation. It was funded by an $8,000 Carnegie grant from the Carnegie Foundation. The property was listed on the National Register of Historic Places in 2003.

The building no longer contains a public library. Since 2001, it has housed the offices of the Polk County Genealogical Society. The Polk County Library now operates the Bolivar Main Branch library at 1690 W. Broadway in Bolivar.

References

Carnegie libraries in Missouri
Libraries on the National Register of Historic Places in Missouri
Neoclassical architecture in Missouri
Library buildings completed in 1915
Buildings and structures in Polk County, Missouri
National Register of Historic Places in Polk County, Missouri